Jeanne Windham is a psychologist and mediator from Polson, Montana who served one term as a Democratic member of the Montana House of Representatives.

She was unseated in 2006 by Rick Jore of the Constitution Party, whom she had defeated in 2004 when the Montana Supreme Court ruled that seven ballots which had been punched for two candidates could not be counted as votes for Jore, thus breaking a tie (and giving control of the House to the Democratic Party).

References 

American women psychologists
21st-century American psychologists
Democratic Party members of the Montana House of Representatives
People from Polson, Montana
Women state legislators in Montana
Living people
Year of birth missing (living people)
21st-century American women